Out of Hours is a six-part British television medical drama series, first broadcast on BBC One on 20 May 1998. Set in the fictional city of Haventry in Birmingham, the series focuses on the lives of three "out of hours" GPs, Dr. Cathy Harding (Lindsey Coulson), Dr. Daniel Laing (John McArdle) and Dr. Paul Featherstone (Dominic West).

For the premiere episode, the Radio Times ran a double-page spread on the series, entitled "the surgery is now closed". A single series of six episodes were broadcast, with the concluding episode broadcasting on 24 June 1998. Episodes broadcast at 21:30 on Wednesdays. The series has yet to be released on DVD.

Casting
The series was notable for featuring Dominic West's first television role, having only previously acted in film. West revealed in 2016 during a webchat for The Guardian that for his role as Dr. Paul Featherstone, he was asked to speak in his natural accent after being told that his Birmingham accent was too "comedic".

In a retrospective interview in 1999, Lindsey Coulson said that she liked the concept of the series, which to her was different. She went on to say how the cast (whom she praised) tried to find their footing but couldn't and that there was a lot of potential.

Cast
 Lindsey Coulson as Dr. Cathy Harding
 John McArdle as Dr. Daniel Laing
 Dominic West as Dr. Paul Featherstone
 Linda Bassett as Carol-Anne Kumar
 Toby Jones as Martin Styles
 Sally Rogers as Janine Noonan
 Nisha K. Nayar as Debra Kumar
 Gabrielle Reidy as Roz Vasey
 Inday Ba as Louise Tiffany
 Glenn Cunningham as French Frank
 Matthew Scurfield as Alan Dace

Episodes

References

External links

1998 British television series debuts
1998 British television series endings
1990s British drama television series
1990s British television miniseries
BBC television dramas
English-language television shows